Universe is a graphic adventure game developed and published by Core Design for the Amiga, Amiga CD32 and DOS platforms in 1994. It was Core Design's second and last effort in the adventure game genre after Curse of Enchantia, of which it was originally planned to be a sequel.

Universe is a space opera that tells the story of Boris, a young man who has been summoned from modern Earth to another universe, where he is destined to become its long forecast savior from evil. The game received mostly positive reviews.

Gameplay
Universe uses a point and click user interface. The player character is controlled via mouse and an icon based control bar that is accessible by pressing the right mouse button, which also pauses the game.

Plot 
The player takes role of a 16-year-old Boris Verne, who is taken to a parallel universe from the present time, when playing around with his eccentric uncle George's newest invention, which he called the Virtual Dimension Inducer. Boris finds himself in an alternate dimension called Pararela, being at the centre of a prophecy that says that he is the Saviour that will end the reign of the mad tyrant King Emperor Neiamises of the Mekelien Empire, who possesses god-like powers and is bent on conquest of the whole galaxy. Throughout the game Boris encounters allies and enemies on a variety of worlds, installations and starships on his quest to bring peace to the universe.

Development

Curse of Enchantia 2
Universe was the second and last point-and-click adventure developed by Core Design, who then instead concentrated on 3D games for the PC and fifth-generation consoles, including what would become Tomb Raider. Initially, it was going to be a direct sequel for Core Design's successful 1992 comic fantasy adventure game Curse of Enchantia, which would continue the adventures of the young teenager Brad as he would return to the other-dimensional realm of Enchantia with his sister Jenny to rid that world of the remaining evil witches. This game was planned but never released, in part because of Robert Toone's departure from the company.

Universe
The game "has grown up so much during the development that it has simply became a follow up", incorporating elements of a film script written by Rolf Mohr several years earlier while he was working with the games Workshop.<ref name=cd32>Amiga CD32 Gamer (September 1994), page 11.</ref> This spiritual successor game ultimately became known as simply Universe (its working title was Curse of Enchantia II), using a completely rewritten game engine and a similar user interface, but with inclusion of in-game text and dialogue. Universe's premise is also similar to that of Curse of Enchantia, featuring a young man (the protagonist's name was changed and he became somewhat older, but like Brad, Boris also has a sister named Jenny) who is transported to another world and has to rid it of an evil overlord, but the game is more serious in its tone.

Responding to some of the criticism directed at Curse of Enchantia, Core Design described Universe as being "a lot" more logical and less linear than their first adventure game. They also described the text-based system as an improvement over the use of only icons, the benefits being that it allowed conversations between characters and simply "it works". They also acknowledged that Curse of Enchantia had "suffered considerably" due to inclusion of action sequences, something that "adventure gamers don't want in their games”, so the ones in Universe were made "short and simple" enough. Furthermore, an improved engine allowed the game to load faster and fit on fewer floppy disks.

The game was notable for its then-unique ability to display 256 colors at once on a standard Amiga 500, instead of just 32, due to its innovative system SPAC (Super Pre-Adjusted Colour). Another feature never seen before on the Amiga was its dynamic music system similar to LucasArts' iMUSE. The game was at first supposed to feature a supporting character, following Boris through the game, but this had to be abandoned because the Amiga lacked enough memory to handle two scaled sprites of the characters at the same time. The animations of the sprite of Boris was rotoscoped; the character is actually a digitized version of Rolf Mohr.

Reception
The Amiga version of the game received mostly highly positive reviews, including 85% from Amiga Computing, 87% from CU Amiga, and 86% from Game Master. Some other reviewers were more critical, such as 7/10 from Amiga Magazine or only 38% from Amiga Format''.

References

External links

1994 video games
Amiga games
Amiga CD32 games
Core Design games
DOS games
Point-and-click adventure games
Science fiction video games
Single-player video games
Space opera video games
Video games about extraterrestrial life
Video games developed in the United Kingdom
Video games about parallel universes
Video games scored by Nathan McCree
Video games set in the 20th century
Video games with rotoscoped graphics